Khvajeh Bachcheh (also Romanized as Khvājeh Bachcheh and Khavājeh Bachcheh) is a village in Mazul Rural District, in the Central District of Nishapur County, Razavi Khorasan Province, Iran. At the 2006 census, its population was 208, in 52 families.

References 

Populated places in Nishapur County